The Polikarpov ITP (Istrebitel Tyazholiy Pushechniy; ; Heavy Cannon Fighter) was a Soviet fighter prototype designed during World War II. Development was prolonged by the evacuation of the design bureau forced by the German advance on Moscow in the fall of 1941. By the time the second prototype was finished the Soviets had fighters with equivalent or better performance  already in production and the program was cancelled.

Development
In November 1940, Nikolai Polikarpov proposed a heavy cannon-armed fighter for bomber escort duties and ground attack missions. The new ITP was designed around either the 1,230 kW (1,650 hp) Klimov M-107P or the Mikulin AM-37 inline engines. Two armament configurations were planned. The first consisted of a  cannon firing through the propeller hub and two synchronized  ShVAK cannon mounted on each side of the fuselage nose. The 37 mm cannon was provided with 50 rounds and the ShVAK had 200 rounds each. The second configuration substituted an additional ShVAK with 200 rounds for the 37 mm cannon. It had racks for eight unguided RS-82 rockets underneath the wings.

The ITP was a low-wing, mixed construction monoplane with a wooden monocoque fuselage made from 'shpon', molded birch plywood. The two-spar metal wing was built in three sections with automatic leading edge slats. The engine radiators were built into the wing center section with intakes in the wing roots while the oil cooler was located under the engine. The curved, one-piece windshield lacked a flat front panel which gave the pilot a rather distorted view. The conventional undercarriage, including the tailwheel, was fully retractable. It carried  of fuel in tanks between the spars of the wing center section. The rear fuselage, cockpit and tail resembled that of the Polikarpov I-185.

The first ITP prototype (M-1) was completed in October 1941 with a  M-107P engine. Due to German attacks, the aircraft was evacuated to Novosibirsk and did not make its first flight until 23 February 1942. The M-107P engine proved unreliable and was changed to a M-107A  in late 1942. The 37 mm gun was removed in exchange for another 20 mm gun mounted on the side of the fuselage.

The second ITP prototype (M-2) was built in 1942 and fitted with a Mikulin AM-37 engine which also proved unreliable and was replaced with a 1,345 kW (1,800 hp) Mikulin AM-39 that December. It first flew on 23 November 1943 but the manufacturer's flight tests were not completed until June 1944. Since several other aircraft with about the same level of performance were already available, it was not placed into production.

Specifications (M-2)

See also

References
Notes

Bibliography

External links
 Line drawings
 Information on Polikarpov ITP

1940s Soviet fighter aircraft
ITP
Single-engined tractor aircraft
Low-wing aircraft
Aircraft first flown in 1942